For Faith and Fatherland is a nationalist, monarchist organization in Russia headed by the Orthodox hieromonk Nikon (Belavenets).

Sources
Valeria Korchagina and Andrei Zolotov Jr. It's Too Early To Forgive Vlasov  The St. Petersburg Times. 6 Nov 2001.
Alexander Verkhovsky Religious Factors in the Parliamentary Election Campaign of 1999 Panorama (Russia)
Nathalie Cooper Voikovskaya Metro Attracts Ire of Priest The Moscow News. 27 Apr 2007.
Russia's Rage  Public Broadcasting Stations (US). 24 Jun 1999.
Monarchism in Russia
Monarchist organizations
Russian nationalist organizations
Eastern Orthodoxy and far-right politics